"The Light in Your Eyes" is a song written by Dan Tyler, and recorded by American country music artist LeAnn Rimes.  It was released in March 1997 as the sixth and final single from her debut album Blue.  The song made it to number five on the Billboard Hot Country Singles & Tracks chart in 1997.

The song was originally slated to be LeAnn's debut single and was sent as a press kit to radio with the music video, along with ten second clips of "Blue", "Hurt Me" and "My Baby". When "Blue" exploded at radio, it replaced this song as her first single. 

She filmed the video for this song before "Blue"'s video.

Track listing
CD single
"Blue" – 2:47
"The Light in Your Eyes" – 3:20

Charts

Year-end charts

References

1997 singles
1996 songs
LeAnn Rimes songs
Curb Records singles
Songs written by Dan Tyler